Segurilla is a municipality located in the province of Toledo, Castile-La Mancha, Spain. According to the 2017 census (INE), the municipality has a population of 1,345 inhabitants. It is located 9 km north of Talavera de la Reina, the second largest town of the Province of Toledo

References 

Municipalities in the Province of Toledo